Shizhong is a district of the city of Leshan, Sichuan Province, China.

Leshan Normal University is located in the district.

References

Districts of Sichuan
Leshan